Mysmena is a genus of spiders in the family Mysmenidae, found in many parts of the world.

Species
, the World Spider Catalog accepted the following species:

Mysmena acuminata (Marples, 1955) – Samoa
Mysmena arcilonga Lin & Li, 2008 – China
Mysmena awari (Baert, 1984) – New Guinea
Mysmena baoxingensis Lin & Li, 2013 – China
Mysmena biangulata (Lin & Li, 2008) – China
Mysmena bizi Miller, Griswold & Yin, 2009 – China
Mysmena calypso Gertsch, 1960 – Trinidad
Mysmena caribbaea (Gertsch, 1960) – Jamaica, Trinidad
Mysmena changouzi Miller, Griswold & Yin, 2009 – China
Mysmena colima (Gertsch, 1960) – Mexico
Mysmena conica (Simon, 1895) – Algeria
Mysmena cornigera (Lin & Li, 2008) – China
Mysmena dumoga (Baert, 1988) – Sulawesi
Mysmena furca Lin & Li, 2008 – China
Mysmena gibbosa Snazell, 1986 – Spain
Mysmena goudao Miller, Griswold & Yin, 2009 – China
Mysmena guianensis Levi, 1956 – Guyana
Mysmena haban Miller, Griswold & Yin, 2009 – China
Mysmena incredula (Gertsch & Davis, 1936) – USA, Bahama Is., Cuba, Panama
Mysmena isolata Forster, 1977 – St. Helena
Mysmena jinlong Miller, Griswold & Yin, 2009 – China
Mysmena leichhardti Lopardo & Michalik, 2013 – Queensland
Mysmena leucoplagiata (Simon, 1879) (type species) – Southern Europe to Azerbaijan, Israel
Mysmena lulanga Lin & Li, 2016 – China
Mysmena maculosa Lin & Li, 2014 – Vietnam
Mysmena marijkeae (Baert, 1982) – New Guinea
Mysmena marplesi (Brignoli, 1980) – New Caledonia
Mysmena mooatae (Baert, 1988) – Sulawesi
Mysmena nojimai Ono, 2010 – Japan
Mysmena nubiai (Baert, 1984) – New Guinea
Mysmena phyllicola (Marples, 1955) – Samoa, Niue
Mysmena quebecana Lopardo & Dupérré, 2008 – Canada
Mysmena rostella Lin & Li, 2008 – China
Mysmena rotunda (Marples, 1955) – Samoa
Mysmena santacruzi (Baert & Maelfait, 1983) – Galapagos Is.
Mysmena shibali Miller, Griswold & Yin, 2009 – China
Mysmena spirala Lin & Li, 2008 – China
Mysmena stathamae (Gertsch, 1960) – Mexico, Panama, Jamaica
Mysmena taiwanica Ono, 2007 – Taiwan
Mysmena tamdaoensis (Lin & Li, 2014) – Vietnam
Mysmena tarautensis (Baert, 1988) – Sulawesi
Mysmena tasmaniae Hickman, 1979 – Tasmania
Mysmena tembei (Baert, 1984) – Paraguay
Mysmena vangoethemi (Baert, 1982) – New Guinea
Mysmena vitiensis Forster, 1959 – Fiji
Mysmena wawuensis Lin & Li, 2013 – China
Mysmena woodwardi Forster, 1959 – New Guinea
Mysmena zhengi Lin & Li, 2008 – China

References

Mysmenidae
Araneomorphae genera
Cosmopolitan spiders